Gary John Dickie was a Scottish footballer who played for Morton, East Stirling, Albion Rovers and Dumbarton.

References

Date of birth missing (living people)
Scottish footballers
Dumbarton F.C. players
Greenock Morton F.C. players
East Stirlingshire F.C. players
Albion Rovers F.C. players
Scottish Football League players
Living people
Association football fullbacks
Year of birth missing (living people)